Kashif Ali (born 4 October 2002 in Karachi, Sindh) is a Pakistani cricketer who plays for Northern. Ali made his first class debut for Northern against Balochistan on 17 November 2021 during the 2021–22 Quaid-e-Azam Trophy. Ali made his List A debut for Northern against Khyber Pakhtunkhwa on 18 December 2022 during the 2022–23 Pakistan Cup.

References

External links 
 
 Kashif Ali at Pakistan Cricket Board

2002 births
Living people
Pakistani cricketers
Sindh cricketers
People from Karachi